John E. Walsh (born April 14, 1958) is an American businessman and political figure who is the Founder and Principal of Walsh Strategies and served as chairman of the Massachusetts Democratic Party.

Political career
A graduate of Cardinal Spellman High School and Princeton University, Walsh's political career began shortly after he graduated from college when he helped a friend who was running for the Abington School Committee. Although his friend lost a close race to an incumbent, Walsh was appointed to the Abington finance committee. At the age of 26, he was elected to the Abington Board of Selectmen, where he would serve from 1983 to 1993. He also spent three years as a member of the Plymouth County Charter Commission.

During the 1998 Massachusetts gubernatorial election, Walsh served as field director of Brian J. Donnelly’s campaign. In 2002 he was the campaign manager for the Massachusetts Democratic Party’s Coordinated Campaign. Walsh served as Deval Patrick's campaign manager during his successful 2006 Massachusetts gubernatorial run and was also the director of his transition team. David Axelrod, a campaign advisor to Barack Obama, described Patrick's 2006 campaign as  a model for Obama’s 2008 presidential campaign.

From 2007 to 2013, Walsh was chairman of the Massachusetts Democratic Party. During his tenure as chairman, Democrat Martha Coakley was upset by Republican Scott Brown in the 2010 United States Senate special election. After this loss, Walsh oversaw the party’s grassroots campaign that helped Senate candidates Elizabeth Warren and Edward Markey win in 2012 and 2013, respectively. The Democrats also retained control over the state’s entire US House delegation, all statewide elected offices, and a supermajority in both houses of the State Legislature. Walsh resigned as chairman to become executive director of Deval Patrick's Together PAC.

In 2015, Walsh formed Walsh Strategies, a consultancy that specializes in helping leaders   and organizations   fully understand and consciously engage their various communities to achieve their goals. 

In the fall of 2018, Walsh was a founder and the Treasurer of Reason To Believe PAC, an organization established to support progressive Democrats and policies across the country in the 2018 election cycle and to learn lessons about the effective use of grassroots tactics in the current political climate.

Business career
Walsh continues to serve as the President of Independence Insurance Agency, Inc., a small insurance agency located in Abington.

Personal life
Walsh grew up in Abington, MA and currently lives with his wife Donna in the Lower Mills section of Dorchester, a neighborhood in Boston, MA.   He has one son, Coleman, who lives in Boston and works at EverTrue.

In 2010, Walsh suffered a mild heart attack.

References

Massachusetts Democratic Party chairs
Massachusetts Democrats
People from Abington, Massachusetts
Living people
1958 births